The Uganda Investment Authority (UIA) is a semi-autonomous investment promotion and facilitation organisation in Uganda and is owned by the government of Uganda.

Location
The headquarters of UIA are located at The Investment Center, The Investment Center, Kampala Industrial and Business Park (KIBP) - Namanve. The coordinates of the head office are:0.3553° N, 32.6925° E (Latitude:0.321667; Longitude:32.576400). The agency maintains a national network of UIA District Focal Point Offices, throughout Uganda.

Overview
The UIA was created by the Ugandan Parliament in 1991. The mission of the UIA is to promote and facilitate investment projects, provide serviced land, and advocate for a competitive business environment. The UIA works with the government and the private sector to promote the economic growth of Uganda through investment and infrastructure development. UIA's parent ministry is the Ministry of Finance, Planning and Economic Development.

Governance
The institution is governed by a seven-person board of directors. As of June 2021, the following individuals were members of that board. The term of the current board runs until 2022.

 Morrison Rwakakamba: Chairman
 Naima Obombasa: Member
 Getrude Lutaaya: Member 
 Godfrey Byamukama: Member
 Joshua Mutambi: Member
Angelo Izama: Member
Beatrice Mpairwe: Member

See also
 Economy of Uganda
 Direct investment
 Uganda Securities Exchange

References

External links
Uganda Investment Authority Website

Government finances in Uganda
Finance in Uganda
Organizations established in 1991
Kampala District
1991 establishments in Uganda
Investment promotion agencies